Small Machine Algol Like Language (SMALL), is a computer programming language developed by Nevil Brownlee of the University of Auckland.

History
The aim of the language was to enable writing ALGOL-like code that ran on a small machine. It also included the string data type for easier text manipulation.

SMALL was used extensively from about 1980 to 1985 at Auckland University as a programming teaching aid, and for some internal projects. Originally, it was written in Fortran IV, to run on a Burroughs Corporation B6700 mainframe computer. Subsequently, it was rewritten in SMALL, and ported to a Digital Equipment Corporation (DEC) PDP-10 mainframe (on the operating system TOPS-10) and an IBM S360 mainframe (on the operating system VM Conversational Monitor System (VM/CMS)).

About 1985, SMALL had some object-oriented programming features added to handle structures (that were missing from the early language), and to formalise file manipulation operations.

See also
Lua (programming language)
Squirrel (programming language)

References

External links
Nevil Brownlee staff page, Center for Applied Internet Data Analysis
Nevil Brownlee personal page, Center for Applied Internet Data Analysis

Algol programming language family
Systems programming languages
Procedural programming languages
Object-oriented programming languages
Programming languages created in 1980